This is a list of websites blocked in the United Kingdom.

Blocked by mobile operators and ISP network filters

Resolved and erroneous blocks

Court ordered implementations targeting copyright and trademark infringement
Sites are blocked using various methods across the "Big 5" UK ISPs, in accordance with Section 97A of the Copyright, Designs and Patents Act 1988, making it difficult to ascertain the extent to which a site is 'blocked' or not. In December 2014, the affected ISPs decided to publish more information about the blocking orders they received.

If a user visits a blocked site within the United Kingdom, the user will be forwarded to www.ukispcourtorders.co.uk which includes the list of blocked domains and court orders.

ISPs with over 400,000 subscribers subject to blocking orders:
 BT Group
 EE
 Sky Broadband
 Talk Talk
 Virgin Media

Indirect blocking
In furtherance of the above-mentioned goal of restricting access to The Pirate Bay and similar sites, the BPI believes that "ISPs are required to block the illegal sites themselves, and proxies and proxy aggregators whose sole or predominant purpose is to give access to the illegal sites." As such, sites linking to sites which acted as proxies to The Pirate Bay were themselves added to the list of banned sites, including piratebayproxy.co.uk, piratebayproxylist.com and ukbay.org. This led to the indirect blocking (or hiding) of sites at the following domains, among others:

See also
 Anti-Counterfeiting Trade Agreement (ACTA)
 Censorship in the United Kingdom
 Computer and network surveillance
 Copyright infringement
 Copyright in the United Kingdom
 Child abuse image content list
 Digital Economy Act 2010
 Digital Economy Act 2017
 EU Copyright Directive
 File sharing in the United Kingdom
 Internet censorship in the United Kingdom
 Internet Watch Foundation and Wikipedia
 Legal aspects of file sharing
 Web blocking in the United Kingdom

References

External links
 wiki.451unavailable.org.uk – The repository for UK court orders requiring domains, IP addresses and URLs to be blocked by internet service providers.
 ukispcourtorders.co.uk – another list maintained by British Telecommunications PLC.

United Kingdom
Internet censorship in the United Kingdom
Websites blocked
Websites
Blocked,United Kingdom